Obikporo is a cultural Igbo village in Onitsha, Anambra State, Nigeria.

Onitsha
Populated places in Anambra State